Samuel Barlay (born 15 September 1986) is a Sierra Leonean footballer who plays as a midfielder. He has represented Sierra Leone at international level.

Club career
Samuel Barlay was born and raised in Freetown. He started his professional football career with top Sierra Leonean club East End Lions in the Sierra Leone National Premier League in 2003.

Barlay signed for Malmö FF from Sierra Leonean East End Lions shortly after the 2003 FIFA U-17 World Championship. In 2006, he was on a season long loan at IFK Mariehamn in the Finnish Veikkausliiga. In 2008, he returned to "Grönvitt" after a loan spell at Örgryte IS in the Swedish second tier of football.

Barlay left IFK Mariehamn, six months before his contract was due to expire, in April 2009.

Following the end of his contract with Syrianska IF, Barlay went on trial with Syrianska FC in January 2011, before signing with Azerbaijan Premier League side FK Mughan.

Barlay left Ravan Baku at the end of his two-year contract in the summer of 2013. Following his release from Ravan Baku, Barlay signed for fellow Azerbaijan Premier League side AZAL on a one-year contract, with the option of a second.

In June 2014 Barlay returned to Syrianska, playing in the Division 2 Norra Svealand. He signed a new one-year contract with Syrianska in December 2014.

In July 2015, Barlay joined Ravan Baku for a second time.

International career
Barlay was the captain of the Sierra Leone U-17 national football team at the 2003 FIFA U-17 World Championship in Finland. Barlay is a first choice at the central midfield position for the Leone Stars, as the Sierra Leone national football team is known. He won a penalty for his country which was converted by Mohamed Kallon that gave the Leone Stars a 1–0 win over South Africa in the 2010 FIFA World Cup/2010 African Cup of Nations qualifying match played in June 2008 in Freetown.

In July 2014, Barlay was suspended in-defiantly, along with Ibrahim Koroma, Ibrahim Kargbo and Christian Caulker over allegations of match-fixing relating to an Africa Cup of Nations qualifier against South Africa which ended 0–0. Barlay and his fellow banned players had their ban lifted in March 2015.

Career statistics

Club

International goals
Scores and results list Sierra Leone's goal tally first.

References

1986 births
Living people
Association football midfielders
Sierra Leonean footballers
Sierra Leonean expatriate footballers
Allsvenskan players
Superettan players
Ettan Fotboll players
Veikkausliiga players
Azerbaijan Premier League players
Malmö FF players
Örgryte IS players
IFK Mariehamn players
Syrianska IF Kerburan players
FK Mughan players
Ravan Baku FC players
AZAL PFK players
Sportspeople involved in betting scandals
Expatriate footballers in Sweden
Expatriate footballers in Finland
Expatriate footballers in Azerbaijan
Sierra Leone international footballers